Live Frogs Set 2 is the second set of live recordings by Les Claypool's Frog Brigade, released on July 24, 2001.  The album is a complete performance of the Pink Floyd studio album Animals.  It is introduced at the end of Live Frogs Set 1 as "more Pink Floyd than any human being should ever withstand", as the band's version of "Shine On You Crazy Diamond" comes to an end.

Track listing
All songs were written by Roger Waters, unless otherwise noted. 
 "Pigs on the Wing 1" – 1:59
 "Dogs" (Waters/Gilmour) – 16:11
 "Pigs (Three Different Ones)" – 11:14
 "Sheep"– 11:13
 "Pigs on the Wing 2" – 1:59

Personnel
(as they appear in the liner notes)
Todd Paclebar Huth—Guitar, vocals
Eenor—Guitar, vocals
Jeff Chimenti—Keyboards, vocals
Jay "Rhino Boy" Lane—Drums, vocals
Skerik—Saxophone
Les Claypool—Bass, vocals

Chart performance

Album

References

Colonel Les Claypool's Fearless Flying Frog Brigade albums
Les Claypool albums
Covers albums
Pink Floyd tribute albums
2001 live albums
Prawn Song Records live albums